Fred Bernard "Sarge" Ferris (December 1, 1928 – March 12, 1989) was an American professional poker player. In 1978, Ferris was considered among the top 12 poker players in the world at that time, as ranked by Poker Magazine.

In the 1980 World Series of Poker, Ferris won a World Series of Poker bracelet in deuce-to-seven draw, winning $150,000. He defeated some of the best professional poker players of that time to win the tournament, including two-time world champion Doyle Brunson, who finished the tournament in second place, and 1978 WSOP Main Event champion Bobby Baldwin, who finished third.

He won a tournament at the 1983 Super Bowl of Poker, organized by Amarillo Slim. Ferris was mainly a cash game player, but also had tournament winnings exceeding $240,000.

On April 22, 1983, Ferris gained notoriety as the Internal Revenue Service seized $46,000 during a high-stakes game at the Horseshoe Casino.

Ferris died in March 1989, and was posthumously inducted into the Poker Hall of Fame in December of that year.

References

Ferris, Fred
Super Bowl of Poker event winners
World Series of Poker bracelet winners
People from Waterville, Maine
1989 deaths
1928 births
Poker Hall of Fame inductees